Haworthiopsis is a genus of succulent plants in the subfamily Asphodeloideae. The genus was previously included in Haworthia. Species in the genus are typically short perennial plants, with leaves often arranged in a rosette and frequently having raised white markings. Many species are cultivated as house plants or by succulent enthusiasts.

Description

Haworthiopsis species are short perennial plants, with or without an obvious stem. The leaves either form a rosette or are arranged in various spirals on a more extended stem. Individual leaves are smooth or have white markings, which may take the form of small protuberances (tubercules) or be more pointed, almost spine-like. The white markings may be on the lower surface of the leaf only, or on both surfaces, and may also extend to the leaf margins. The upper leaf surfaces are "windowed" in some species, and the margins may have toughened teeth.

The flowers are borne in a raceme on a long, stiff stalk (peduncle) which also bears a few bracts without flowers in their junctions with the stalk. Both the outer and inner tepals are joined together at their bases. The stamens and the style are enclosed within the tepals. The fruit is a narrowly ovoid capsule with black or dark brown seeds.

Two-lipped flowers were considered a distinguishing characteristic of the genus Haworthia, before Haworthiopsis and Tulista were split off. More detailed features of the flowers now identify the three genera. In Haworthiopsis, the flowers and their styles are usually straight rather than curved; the outer and inner whorls of three tepals are joined to one another at the base; and the flowers taper smoothly into the flower stem (pedicel) rather than being broader at the base with a sharp junction.

Taxonomy

The genus Haworthiopsis was erected by Gordon Rowley in 2013, with the type species Haworthiopsis coarctata. The ending -opsis derives from the Greek  (opsis), meaning 'appearance', hence Haworthiopsis means "like Haworthia".

The taxonomic history of the genus is complex. In 1753, Carl Linnaeus followed authors before him in using the genus Aloe for a wide range of plants now placed in the tribe Aloeae by those using the broad circumscription of the family Asphodelaceae (sensu APG III onwards). Linnaeus's Aloe species included two now placed in Haworthiopsis. The genus Haworthia was established by Henri Auguste Duval in 1809 for former Aloe species with smaller whitish two-lipped (bilabiate) flowers. Many additional taxa were later added, at both species and infraspecies ranks. This has been described as "causing a great deal of confusion". In 1971, M.B. Bayer divided Haworthia into three subgenera: H. subg. Haworthia, H. subg. Hexangulares and H. subg. Robustipedunculatae.

Phylogenetic studies, particularly from 2010 onwards, showed that Haworthia and other genera related to Aloe were not monophyletic. Accordingly, in 2013, Rowley separated most of the species formerly placed in Haworthia subg. Hexangulares into a new genus, Haworthiopsis. Haworthiopsis was revised in 2013 by Manning et al. so that the genus more closely correlated with the former subgenus, a revision described as "more coherent" by Gildenhuys and Klopper in 2016.

Sections and Species
In 2016, Gildenhuys and Klopper proposed a division of the genus into seven sections, although noting that it could need re-evaluation when further phylogenetic studies had been carried out. Their section Koelmaniorum is least clearly placed in the genus, and the status of sections Limifoliae and Tessellatae is also uncertain.

, the World Checklist of Selected Plant Families accepted the following species:

References

 
Asphodelaceae genera